A proteolysis targeting chimera (PROTAC) is a heterobifunctional molecule composed of two active domains and a linker, capable of removing specific unwanted proteins. Rather than acting as a conventional enzyme inhibitor, a PROTAC works by inducing selective intracellular proteolysis. PROTACs consist of two covalently linked protein-binding molecules: one capable of engaging an E3 ubiquitin ligase, and another that binds to a target protein meant for degradation. Recruitment of the E3 ligase to the target protein results in ubiquitination and subsequent degradation of the target protein via the proteasome. Because PROTACs need only to bind their targets with high selectivity (rather than inhibit the target protein's enzymatic activity), there are currently many efforts to retool previously ineffective inhibitor molecules as PROTACs for next-generation drugs.

Initially described by Kathleen Sakamoto, Craig Crews and Ray Deshaies in 2001, the PROTAC technology has been applied by a number of drug discovery labs using various E3 ligases, including pVHL, CRBN, Mdm2, beta-TrCP1, DCAF15, DCAF16, RNF114, and c-IAP1. Yale University licensed the PROTAC technology to Arvinas in 2013–14.

In 2019, Arvinas put two PROTACs into clinical trials: ARV-110, an androgen receptor degrader, and ARV-471, an estrogen receptor degrader.

Mechanism of action

PROTACs achieve degradation through "hijacking" the cell's ubiquitin–proteasome system (UPS) by bringing together the target protein and an E3 ligase. 

First, the E1 ligase activates and conjugates the ubiquitin to the E2 ligase. The E2 ligase then forms a complex with the E3 ligase. The E3 ligase targets proteins and covalently attaches the ubiquitin to the protein of interest. Eventually, after a ubiquitin chain is formed, the protein is recognized and degraded by the 26S proteasome. PROTACs take advantage of this cellular system by putting the protein of interest in close proximity to the E3 ligase to catalyze degradation.

Unlike traditional inhibitors, PROTACs have a catalytic mechanism, with the PROTAC itself being recycled after the target protein is degraded.

Design and development 
The protein targeting warhead, E3 ligase, and linker must all be considered for PROTAC development. Formation of a ternary complex between the protein of interest, PROTAC, and E3 ligase may be evaluated to characterize PROTAC activity because it often leads to ubiquitination and subsequent degradation of the targeted protein. A hook effect is commonly observed with high concentrations of PROTACs due to the bifunctional nature of the degrader.

Currently, pVHL and CRBN have been used in preclinical trials as E3 ligases. However, there still remains hundreds of E3 ligases to be explored, with some giving the opportunity for cell specificity.

Benefits 
Compared to traditional inhibitors, PROTACs display multiple benefits that make them desirable drug candidates. Due to their catalytic mechanism, PROTACs can be administered at lower doses compared to their inhibitor analogues. Some PROTACs have been shown to be more selective than their inhibitor analogues, reducing off-target effects. PROTACs have the ability to target previously undruggable proteins, as they do not need to target catalytic pockets. This also helps prevent mutation-driven drug resistance often found with enzymatic inhibitors.

References 

Pharmacology
Biotechnology